Canfield is a surname. Notable people with the surname include:

Benet Canfield (1562–1611), English mystic
Brady Canfield (born 1963), American skeleton racer
Cass Canfield (1897–1986), American publishing executive
Charles A. Canfield (1848–1913), American oilman and real estate developer
Chuck Canfield (born 1932), American businessman and former mayor of Rochester, Minnesota
Clarke Canfield, American journalist
Dave Canfield, Canadian politician
Donald Canfield (born 1958), geologist
Dorothy Canfield Fisher (1879–1958), American educational reformer
Francesca Anna Canfield (1803–1833), American linguist, poet, translator
Glenn Canfield Jr. (1935–2006), American metallurgist and businessman
Gordon Canfield (1898–1972), American lawyer and politician
Harry C. Canfield (1875–1945), US Representative from Indiana
Jack Canfield (born 1944), American motivational speaker
James Hulme Canfield (1847–1909), 4th. President of Ohio State University
Jean Canfield (born 1918), former Canadian politician
Judson Canfield (1759–1840), Connecticut state legislator and state court judge
Kid Canfield (1878–1935), American gambler and confidence trickster, real name George Washington Bonner
Mary Grace Canfield (1924–2014), American actress
Matthew Canfield (1604–1673), founding settler of Norwalk, Connecticut and Newark, New Jersey 
Richard Albert Canfield (1855–1914), American businessman, art dealer, and gambler
Robert R. Canfield (1909–1994), American politician and lawyer
Sean Canfield, American footballer
Trevor Canfield (born 1986), American footballer
William Canfield, American medical researcher

See also 

 Great Canfield, England
 Canfield, Ohio, named for Justin Canfield

Surnames
English-language surnames
Surnames of English origin
Surnames of British Isles origin